Sierra Leone competed at the 2018 Commonwealth Games in the Gold Coast, Australia from April 4 to April 15, 2018.

Competitors
The following is the list of number of competitors participating at the Games per sport/discipline.

Athletics

Men
Track & road events

Women
Track & road events

Beach volleyball

Sierra Leone qualified a men's beach volleyball team, by winning the African qualification tournament held in October 2017.

Boxing

Sierra Leone participated with a team of 2 athletes (2 men).

Men

Cycling

Sierra Leone participated with 2 athletes (2 men).

Road
Men

Squash

Sierra Leone participated with 3 athletes (3 men).

Individual

Doubles

Swimming

Sierra Leone participated with 2 athletes (1 man and 1 woman).

Table tennis

Sierra Leone participated with 2 athletes (2 men).

Singles

Doubles

Wrestling

Sierra Leone participated with 3 athletes (2 men and 1 woman).

See also
Sierra Leone at the 2018 Summer Youth Olympics

References

Nations at the 2018 Commonwealth Games
Sierra Leone at the Commonwealth Games
2018 in Sierra Leonean sport